The Judo at the 2009 Lusofonia Games event was held at the Pavilhão Atlântico in Lisbon, Portugal from 14 to 15 July 2009.

Medal table by country

Results

Men's Results

Women's Results

References

External links
 

2009 Lusofonia Games
Lusophony Games
2009
Lusofonia Games 2009